Bodley Scott may refer to:

 Mark Bodley Scott (1923–2013), English rower who competed in the 1948 Summer Olympics
 Sir Ronald Bodley Scott (1906–1982), English haematologist and Royal physician